Laban Notation Symbols generally refers to the wide range of notation symbols (or signs) developing from the original work of Rudolf Laban and used in many different types of  Laban Movement Study such as Labanotation and Laban Movement Analysis for graphically representing human body positions and movements.

History
see Rudolf Laban

Notation staff
The concept of a "staff" is borrowed from music and the musical staff.  It provides the basic framework for notating.

Body symbols

Spatial symbols
Several different methods have developed for notating space.

General spatial changes

Direction symbols

In Labanotation the direction symbols are organized as three levels: high, middle, and low (or deep):

In Laban Movement Analysis and Space Harmony (Choreutics) the same 27 direction symbols are used but they have a different conceptualization.  Instead of envisaging the signs on three parallel horizontal planes (high, middle, and low levels), the direction signs are organized according to the octahedron, cube (hexahedron), and the icosahedron.

Vector motion symbols

In his early German publication Choreographie, Rudolf Laban used a different group of spatial directional signs which represented orientation of lines of motion (rather than orientations of limb positions).
These signs were translated into modern-day Labanotation signs, and referred to as "vector signs".

Symbols for quality or dynamics

Symbols for relationships
"Relationships"' is used in a broad sense to refer to interactions amongst two or more bodies, for example awareness, focus, nearness, contact, physical weight support.  Many fine distinctions have been deciphered.  These have some relationship to Proxemics.

Notes and references

Further reading

 Hutchinson, Ann. (1970). Labanotation or Kinetography Laban: The System of Analyzing and Recording Movement. 3rd revised edition (1977). New York: Theatre Arts Books. (First published 1954).
 Hutchinson-Guest, Ann (1983). Your move: A New Approach to the Study of Movement and Dance. New York: Gordon and Breach.
 Hutchinson-Guest, Ann (1989). Choreo-Graphics; A Comparison of Dance Notation Systems from the Fifteenth Century to the Present. New York: Gordon and Breach.
 Knust, Albrecht. (1948a). The development of the Laban kinetography (part I). Movement. 1 (1): 28–29.
 Knust, Albrecht (1948b). The development of the Laban kinetography (part II). Movement. 1 (2): 27-28.
 Knust, Albrecht (1979a). Dictionary of Kinetography Laban (Labanotation); Volume I: Text. Translated by A. Knust, D. Baddeley-Lang, S. Archbutt, and I. Wachtel. Plymouth: MacDonald and Evans.
 Knust, Albrecht. (1979b). Dictionary of Kinetography Laban (Labanotation); Volume II: Examples. Translated by A. Knust, D. Baddeley-Lang, S. Archbutt, and I. Wachtel. Plymouth: MacDonald and Evans.
 Laban, Rudolf. (1926). Choreographie (German). Jena: Eugen Diederichs.
 Laban, Rudolf (1975). Laban’s Principles of Dance and Movement Notation. 2nd edition edited and annotated by Roderyk Lange. London: MacDonald and Evans. (First published 1956.)
 Preston-Dunlop, V. (1969). Practical Kinetography Laban. London: MacDonald and Evans.

Laban movement analysis
Dance research